Walter Meyer (14 September 1904 – 5 December 1949) was a German rower who competed in the 1932 Summer Olympics.

In 1932 he won the gold medal as member of the German boat in the coxed four competition. He died in the NKVD special camp Nr. 7 after World War II.

References

External links
 Walter Meyer's profile at databaseOlympics

1904 births
1949 deaths
Olympic rowers of Germany
Rowers at the 1932 Summer Olympics
Olympic gold medalists for Germany
Olympic medalists in rowing
German male rowers
Medalists at the 1932 Summer Olympics
People who died in NKVD special camp Nr. 7
20th-century deaths from tuberculosis
Tuberculosis deaths in Germany